Banquet Records is a record shop in Kingston upon Thames, Greater London. Formerly part of the Beggars Banquet Records retail chain, it became fully independent in 2002. It stocks a broad range of music on both vinyl and CD. The establishment is also home to Gravity DIP music management, as well as the Banquet Records record label.

History 
Started as part of the Beggars Banquet chain of record stores before becoming fully independent in 2002. The store was sold to the then manager, however decreased profits led the store to near bankruptcy towards the end of 2004.

In February 2005, Banquet Records was taken over by new owners; previous employees of the Beggars store, Jon Tolley and Mike Smith.

In 2017, the store won Music Week's award for best independent retailer of the year.

Services
The store uses its slogan "More than just your local record store" to provide services other than the sale of music, as it also runs various concerts, club nights and in-stores in and around Kingston upon Thames. The use of slogan has been described as such: "The premise outlined in their advertising strap line is simple: 'More than your local record store'. And it is incredibly apt. Not just content with supplying Kingston's art school students and music aficionados with their favourites, Banquet Records has firmly placed itself at the heart of this vibrant town's music scene."

It stocks a broad range of music on both vinyl and CD but mainly specialises in new music from indie, punk, emo, electronica, house, drum 'n' bass and hip hop and funk genres. As well as selling Vinyl Records and CDs, the store also sells merch, record players, record boxes and general vinyl accessories.

The store takes part in Record Store Day, an annual celebration of independent record stores.

Promotions

In-stores 
Banquet Records regularly features in store performances. Bands that have performed in store at Banquet include: Mayday Parade; Title Fight; Frank Iero; The Flatliners; Gnarwolves; Lemuria; Knuckle Puck; Jimmy Eat World; Moose Blood; Great Cynics; Apologies, I have none; and Trash Boat.

Club Nights 
Banquet Records has run the regular New Slang indie club nights in Kingston since 2006 (named after The Shins song). Artists who have played include:
British Sea Power 
Ed Sheeran
Fall Out Boy
Foals
Frank Turner
Kaiser Chiefs
James Bay (singer)
Jamie T
Mystery Jets
Royal Blood
Rudimental
Savages
Suede
The 1975
Wolf Alice

Other shows 
Banquet Records also holds separate one-off shows, the majority being held at The Hippodrome and The Fighting Cocks in Kingston upon Thames, as well as at the Rose Theatre, Kingston College and All Saints Church. The Store hosted a Blink-182 concert at the Rose Theatre, which it claimed was the store's biggest show, for the lead up to the band's new album. Other major artists to have played shows organised by Banquet include Biffy Clyro, Craig David, Fall Out Boy and Zara Larsson.

Record label 
The Banquet Records shop is also home to a music label of the same name. It has issued music by UK artists, sometimes to support tours. It also release foreign artist which don't have UK distribution deals. The label was created by the current owners of the shop. They were actually running the label before they bought the shop in 2004. Artists released include:

 Modern Baseball
 Lightyear
 Tonight Alive

https://www.banquetrecords.com/banquet-label?w=59

References 

Independent stores
Music retailers of the United Kingdom